The 5th Annual Grammy Awards were held on May 15, 1963, at Chicago, Los Angeles and New York City. They recognized accomplishments by musicians for the year 1962. Tony Bennett and Igor Stravinsky each won 3 awards.

Award winners 
Record of the Year
Tony Bennett for "I Left My Heart in San Francisco"
Album of the Year (other than classical)
Vaughn Meader for The First Family
Song of the Year
Leslie Bricusse & Anthony Newley (songwriters) for "What Kind of Fool Am I?" performed by Sammy Davis, Jr.
Best New Artist
Robert Goulet

Children's 
Best Recording for Children
Leonard Bernstein (conductor) for Saint-Saëns: Carnival of the Animals/Britten: Young Person's Guide to the Orchestra

Classical 
Best Classical Performance - Orchestra
Igor Stravinsky (conductor) & the Columbia Symphony Orchestra for Stravinsky: The Firebird Ballet
Best Classical Performance - Vocal Soloist (with or without orchestra)
Leonard Bernstein (conductor), Eileen Farrell & the New York Philharmonic for Götterdämmerung - Brunnhilde's Immolation Scene/Wesendonck Songs
Best Opera Recording
Georg Solti (conductor), Robert Merrill, Leontyne Price, Giorgio Tozzi, Jon Vickers, & the Rome Opera House Orchestra for Verdi: Aida
Best Classical Performance - Choral (other than opera)
Otto Klemperer (conductor), Wilhelm Pitz (choir director) & the Philharmonia Orchestra & Chorus for Bach: St. Matthew Passion
Best Classical Performance - Instrumental Soloist or Soloists (with orchestra)
Igor Stravinsky (conductor), Isaac Stern & the Columbia Symphony Orchestra for Stravinsky: Violin Concerto in D
Best Classical Performance - Instrumental Soloist or Duo (without orchestra)
Vladimir Horowitz for Columbia Records Presents Vladimir Horowitz
Best Classical Performance - Chamber Music
Jascha Heifetz, Gregor Piatigorsky & William Primrose for The Heifetz-Piatigorsky Concerts With Primrose, Pennario and Guests
Best Contemporary Composition
Igor Stravinsky (composer and conductor) for Stravinsky: The Flood
Album of the Year - Classical
Vladimir Horowitz for Columbia Records Presents Vladimir Horowitz

Composing and arranging 
Best Instrumental Theme
Bobby Scott & Ric Marlowe (composers) for "A Taste of Honey"
Best Instrumental Arrangement
Henry Mancini (arranger) for "Baby Elephant Walk"
Best Background Arrangement
Marty Manning (arranger) for "I Left My Heart in San Francisco" performed by Tony Bennett

Country 
Best Country & Western Recording
Burl Ives for "Funny Way of Laughin'"

Folk 
Best Folk Recording
Peter, Paul and Mary for "If I Had a Hammer"

Gospel 
Best Gospel or Other Religious Recording
Mahalia Jackson for Great Songs of Love and Faith

Jazz 
Best Jazz Performance - Soloist Or Small Group (Instrumental)
Stan Getz for "Desafinado"
Best Jazz Performance - Large Group (Instrumental)
Stan Kenton for Adventures In Jazz
Best Original Jazz Composition
Vince Guaraldi (composer) for "Cast Your Fate to the Wind" performed by the Vince Guaraldi Trio

Musical show 
Best Original Cast Show Album
Richard Rodgers (composer) & the original cast (Richard Kiley, Diahann Carroll, Bernice Mass, Noelle Adam, Don Chastain, Mitchell Gregg & Noelle Adam) for No Strings

Packaging and notes 
Best Album Cover - Classical
Marvin Schwartz (art director) for The Intimate Bach performed by Laurindo Almeida, Virginia Majewski & Vincent DeRosa
Best Album Cover - Other Than Classical
Robert M. Jones (art director) for Lena...Lovely and Alive performed by Lena Horne

Pop 
Best Solo Vocal Performance, Female
Ella Fitzgerald for Ella Swings Brightly with Nelson
Best Solo Vocal Performance, Male
Tony Bennett for "I Left My Heart in San Francisco"
Best Performance by a Vocal Group
Peter, Paul and Mary for "If I Had a Hammer"
Best Performance by a Chorus
The New Christy Minstrels for Presenting The New Christy Minstrels
Best Performance by an Orchestra - for Dancing
Joe Harnell for Fly Me to the Moon and the Bossa Nova Pops
Best Performance by an Orchestra or Instrumentalist with Orchestra, Not for Jazz or Dancing
Peter Nero for The Colorful Peter Nero
Best Rock and Roll Recording
Bent Fabric for "Alley Cat"

Production and engineering 
Best Engineering Contribution - Other Than Novelty and Other Than Classical
Al Schmitt (engineer) for Hatari! performed by Henry Mancini
Best Engineered Recording - Classical
Lewis W. Layton (engineer), Fritz Reiner (conductor) & the Chicago Symphony Orchestra for Strauss: Also Sprach Zarathustra
Best Engineering Contribution - Novelty
Robert Fine (engineer) for The Civil War, Vol. I performed by Martin Gabel & Frederick Fennell

R&B 
Best Rhythm & Blues Recording
Ray Charles for "I Can't Stop Loving You"

Spoken 
Best Documentary or Spoken Word Recording (other than comedy)
Charles Laughton for The Story-Teller: A Session With Charles Laughton

References

 005
1963 in Los Angeles
1963 in Illinois
1963 in New York City
1963 music awards
1960s in Chicago
Events in Los Angeles
Events in New York City
1963 in American music
May 1963 events in the United States
Events in Chicago